Wang Xin may refer to:

Wang Xin (badminton) (born 1985), Chinese female badminton player
Wang Xin (diver) (born 1992), Chinese female diver
Wang Xin (artist) (born 1983), Chinese artist
Wang Xin (footballer) (born 1997), Chinese footballer
Wang Xin (judoka) (born 1995), Chinese judoka